Ivan Fadeev (24 March 1906–21 October 1976) was a Soviet economist and politician who served as the minister of finance of the Russian Soviet Federative Socialist Republic (RSFSR) from September 1949 to March 1973.

Biography
Fadeev was born on 24 March 1906 in Gzhatsk, now Gagarin, in the Smolensk region. Until 1924 he was in the army. Then, he completed his undergraduate education at the Moscow Financial and Economic Institute in 1930. In 1937 he joined the Communist Party of the Soviet Union. He served there in several posts, including head of the national economy sector of the People's Commissariat of Finance of the Yakut ASSR, and deputy of the People's Commissar of Finance of the Yakut ASSR. In October 1938 he began to work in the central office of the Ministry of Finance. From 1938 to 1941 he was the head of the budget department of the ministry. Between 1941 and 1942 he was the deputy at the ministry's department for state control. From September 1949 to March 1973, he served as the minister of finance. In addition, he was elected several times as a deputy to the Supreme Soviet of the RSFSR during his career. Fadeev retired from the office in 1973. 

Fadeev married Claudia Ivanovna Fadeeva (1905-1980) who was also an economist. He died in Moscow on 21 October 1976 and was buried there in Novodevichy cemetery. He was the recipient of various awards, including the Order of Lenin, the October Revolution, the Red Banner of Labor and other medals.

References

External links

1906 births
1976 deaths
Burials at Novodevichy Cemetery
Communist Party of the Soviet Union members
Financial University under the Government of the Russian Federation alumni
People from Gagarinsky District, Smolensk Oblast
People of the Cold War
Recipients of the Order of Lenin
Soviet economists
Soviet Ministers of Finance